Matthew Allard de Vere Drummond (born Matthew Allard Robert Vaughn; 7 March 1971) is an English filmmaker. He has produced films including Lock, Stock and Two Smoking Barrels (1998) and Snatch (2000), and directed Layer Cake (2004), Stardust (2007), Kick-Ass (2010), X-Men: First Class (2011), Kingsman: The Secret Service (2014) and its sequel Kingsman: The Golden Circle (2017), and produced, co-wrote, and directed its prequel The King's Man (2021).

Early life
Vaughn was born in Paddington, London, England. Until 2002, he had thought that he was the child of a relationship between his mother, Kathy Ceaton (died 20 July 2013), and American actor Robert Vaughn. A paternity investigation in the 1980s revealed that Robert Vaughn was not his father, but Ceaton had never revealed otherwise to Vaughn. Upon asking his mother about his true paternity, she revealed that his father was George Albert Harley de Vere Drummond, an English banker. Early in Vaughn's life, before the paternity investigation, Robert Vaughn had asked for the child's surname to be Vaughn, and it continues today as Vaughn's professional name, though he now uses de Vere Drummond in his personal life.

Vaughn was educated at Sussex House School in London and then Stowe School in Buckingham. Taking a gap year between Stowe and university, he travelled around the world on a Hard Rock Cafe tour. After arriving in Los Angeles he began working as an assistant to a film director. He later returned to London, and attended University College London studying anthropology and ancient history. He dropped out after a few weeks.

Career
Aged 25, Vaughn produced a low-budget thriller, The Innocent Sleep (1996), starring Annabella Sciorra and Michael Gambon. He continued as a producer on close friend Guy Ritchie's film Lock, Stock and Two Smoking Barrels. The film was a critical, popular and financial success, earning Vaughn and Ritchie £9 million each. Vaughn would later produce Ritchie's Snatch and Swept Away.

Vaughn made his directorial debut in 2004 with Layer Cake. The film was well received and its success led to Vaughn being tapped to direct X-Men: The Last Stand (2006), but he dropped out only two weeks before filming began. Subsequently, he said the film was "pretty good" given the limited time they had to make it, but he was critical of Brett Ratner's direction of the film. For his next project he co-wrote and directed Stardust, followed by a movie adaptation of Mark Millar's Kick-Ass in 2010. Vaughn directed and co-wrote the first film in the prequel trilogy of the X-Men film universe titled, X-Men: First Class (2011). Vaughn was signed to return to the series as director of the sequel, X-Men: Days of Future Past (2014), but dropped out in favour of Bryan Singer who had directed the first two films in the original trilogy, X-Men and X2: X-Men United. Vaughn remained attached to the film by co-writing the script.

Vaughn's next directorial project, was Kingsman: The Secret Service (2014), an adaptation of Mark Millar and David Gibbons's comic book The Secret Service. The film was scripted by Vaughn and Jane Goldman, and produced by Vaughn's production company Marv Films. Vaughn returned to direct, produce, and co-write the Kingsman sequel, Kingsman: The Golden Circle, which was released in theaters in September 2017. Vaughn also directed and provided the story for The King's Man, the third installment in the franchise serving as a prequel to the original film. Delayed from November 2019 due to both the schedule shuffle following Disney's acquisition of 21st Century Fox and the subsequent COVID-19 pandemic, the film was released on 22 December 2021.

In March 2017, Collider reported that Vaughn was top choice to direct Man of Steel 2; in September of that year, Vaughn confirmed that he was in negotiations with the studio to helm the project. By March 2019, Vaughn stated that discussions with Warner Bros. had ended, and he was no longer involved with development of the film.

Vaughn began working on spy film Argylle in 2021, based on the as-yet unpublished novel by Ellie Conway and starring an ensemble cast including Henry Cavill, Sam Rockwell, Bryce Dallas Howard, Samuel L. Jackson, Bryan Cranston and John Cena. The film will be distributed by Apple TV+, who obtained the rights for $200 million.

Personal life
On 25 May 2002, Vaughn married German model Claudia Schiffer in Suffolk. The couple have a son and two daughters. The couple have homes in Notting Hill, London, Northamptonshire and Coldham Hall, Stanningfield, Suffolk.

According to Mark Millar, Vaughn is a conservative and Thatcherite.

Filmography

Film

Producer only

Television
Executive producer
 Lock, Stock... (2000)
 Swag (2003)
 Make My Day (2003) (Documentary)

Video game
Producer
 Kick-Ass: The Game (2010)

Frequent collaborators 
Actors and actresses

Film crew

References

External links

 
 Interview, Superherohype.com; accessed 28 February 2015

1971 births
Action film directors
Alumni of University College London
English film directors
English film producers
English male screenwriters
English screenwriters
Hugo Award-winning writers
Living people
Mass media people from Bury St Edmunds
People educated at Sussex House School
People educated at Stowe School